Kamchatka Krai was formed on July 1, 2007 as a result of the merger of Kamchatka Oblast with Koryak Autonomous Okrug.

Administrative and municipal divisions

 ✪ - part of Koryak Okrug (Корякия о́круг)

See also
Administrative divisions of Kamchatka Oblast
Administrative divisions of Koryak Autonomous Okrug

References

Kamchatka Krai
Kamchatka Krai